Eugène Konopatzky (born January 27, 1887, in Lutsk – on October 19, 1962, in Paris) was Russian and Ukrainian painter and printmaker, known artist and modern art theoretician of Russian avant-garde (historically the term "Russian Avant-garde" refers to the art of all countries which were parts of Russia/USSR in the beginning of 20th century).

Biography

In 1914 he organized the exhibition Kiltse ("The Ring") in Kiev, together with Aleksandra Ekster and Alexander Bogomazov among others.

Eugène Konopatzky exhibited from 1925 in Paris, at the Salon des Indépendants.

Since 1927 he exhibited his paintings at the Salon d'Automne.

References

Notes 
 Bénézit, 1976 : Eugène Konopatzky

External links

 Konopatzky, Eugen; Benezit Dictionary of Artists, 2006, site Oxford Index (subscription or library membership required)
 1;2 Eugène Konopatzky
 A.Bogomazov. Painting and Elements. 1914. (scanned from О.Богомазов / A.Bogomazov. Живопис та Елементи / Painting and Elements. Kyiv, 1996). For non-commercial use only
 pdf, Society Independent Artists in Odessa; O.M.Barkovskaya, 2012, p.142

1887 births
1962 deaths
20th-century Ukrainian painters
20th-century Ukrainian male artists
Modern painters
Russian avant-garde
Russian artists
Ukrainian avant-garde
Ukrainian male painters
Soviet emigrants to France